Johnston Spur is a spur in the central part of the Guettard Range, extending eastward to the flank of Johnston Glacier, in Palmer Land, Antarctica. It was mapped by the United States Geological Survey from surveys and U.S. Navy air photos, 1961–67, and was named by the Advisory Committee on Antarctic Names for Thomas M. Johnston, an equipment operator with the South Pole Station winter party in 1965.

References

Ridges of Palmer Land